Josef Ritter von Schmitt (born 4 March 1838 – 16 April 1907) was a Bavarian politician and prominent jurist, who served as the 14th President of Upper Franconia from the turn of the century until his death in 1907.

A prominent figure in Bavarian politics, von Schmitt served as the President of the Court for the Kingdom of Bavaria under the Bavarian Regency, as well as the primary advisor to Prince Luitpold of Bavaria. Josef's brother, served as President of the Bavarian Supreme Court in Munich.

Aside from politics, von Schmitt was a key industrial figure in Bavaria, holding positions on multiple large Conglomerates. He was on the board of Dresdner Bank,  and from 1898 until his death he served as chairman of the board of the Schweinfurt ball producer , contributing decisively to its boom. In von Schmitt's later life, he served as privy councilor and was awarded honorary citizenship of the city of Bamberg, a city which he had previously led.

Early life
At University, von Schmitt read law, continuing towards his PhD at the University of Heidelberg, where he won the annual prize for his dissertation, allowing him to become a Doctor of Law.

Career 

By 1866, von Schmitt was serving as a professor at the University of Wurzburg, where he married Maria Isabella Lindner. From here, von Schmitt was assigned to the District Court of Wurzburg, then onto Bamberg. Though he later served as Mayor of Bamberg, von Schmitt had a vast impact on the city itself. His efforts to relocate the 5th Royal Bavarian Division, which was formed on October 1, 1890, in Landau, from Bamberg, as well as his expansion of municipal water and gas services largely transformed Bamberg; a city which he, at the time, represented in the Upper Franconian council.

Acting as a highly regarded defence attorney, prosecutor and judge in his home town of Bamberg, von Schmitt was enabled to later expand his legal practice and branch into politics. Appointed to the Upper Franconian parliament, von Schmitt served as its president for many years. von Schmitt's brother, followed a similar path, later becoming President of the Bavarian Supreme Court.

From 1870, Schmitt held the prestigious title of a Royal Lawyer of Bamberg, working directly with the crown of Bavaria. The profession of lawyer was at that time a state-assigned department. From 1884 to 1905 he was Regional Court President in Bamberg.  He later became a Bavarian Privy Councillor

Business enterprises 

Schmitt was also, notably, an extremely successful businessman. In Gründerzeit, he was involved in numerous start-ups. He was on the board of Dresdner Bank, . From 1898 until his death he served as chairman of the board of the Schweinfurt ball producer " " which later merged to become the conglomerate SKF, and Schmitt contributed decisively to the boom of the company.

Schmitt also performed a number of honorary functions, these included being chairman of the Community Plenipotentiary Collegium and president of the district administrators in Bamberg.

Honours 

On September 26, 1889, von Schmitt was granted honorary citizenship of Bamberg for his extraordinary efforts. The main street in Bamberg, "Dr.-von-Schmitt-Straße" also bears his name today.

In 1896 Prince Regent Luitpold, Prince Regent of Bavaria awarded him the Ritterkreuz of Order of Merit of the Bavarian Crown. With the award of the title and he was entered into German nobility with the title of Dr. Josef Ritter von Schmitt; Ritter is a hereditary title roughly equivalent to the British Baronet.

In the week of his death, von Schmitt was presented a commemorative sheet by the Lutz Lord Mayor.

Notes 
 Ritter is a German hereditary title of nobility, passed through male line descendants. It translates to Imperial Knight.

References

Literature 
 Heinz F. Fränkel: Bamberger Straßennamen.
  (Nebeneintrag)
 Lothar Dorn: Zwei bedeutende Brüder aus Hofheim. Die Brüder Gottfried und Joseph Ritter von Schmitt. In: Chronik der Stadt Hofheim und ihrer Stadtteile. Arbeitskreis Hofheimer Stadtgeschichte. (Hrsg.). Hofheim 1993, S. 93–98.

External links 
 Dr Heller und Kollegen

1838 births
1907 deaths
19th-century German people
20th-century German people
Josef